AD 16 (XVI) was a leap year starting on Wednesday (link will display the full calendar) of the Julian calendar. In the Roman Empire, it was known as the Year of the Consulship of Taurus and Libo (or, less frequently, year 769 Ab urbe condita). The denomination AD 16 for this year has been used since the early medieval period, when the Anno Domini calendar era became the prevalent method in Europe for naming years.

Events

By place

Roman Empire 
 A Roman army of 50,000 men commanded by Germanicus gains a great victory at Idistaviso, defeating the German war chief Arminius, and recovering the lost eagles of Varus' legions.
 Germanicus employs the North Sea fleet to avoid dangerous rivers, embarking an army in the Rhine Delta, aboard circa 1,000 ships. He defeats the Germans at the Amisius river estuary and the Weser, but during its return, the Roman fleet is partially destroyed by storms.
 Vonones, the beleaguered king of Armenia, is summoned to Syria, by Roman governor Creticus Silanus.

By topic

Arts and sciences 
 Ovid's "Epistulae ex Ponto" appears.

Births 
 September 16 – Julia Drusilla, daughter of Germanicus and Agrippina the Elder (d. AD 38)
 Claudius Drusus, son of Claudius and Plautia Urgulanilla (approximate date)
 Decimus Junius Silanus Torquatus, Roman consul (d. AD 64)

Deaths 
 September 13 – Marcus Scribonius Libo, Roman senator (forced to commit suicide)
 Clemens, Roman slave and impostor (executed by Tiberius) 
 Scribonia, second wife of Caesar Augustus (approximate date)

References 

0016

als:10er#16